Rashid al-Din Muhammad ibn Muhammad ibn Abd Jalil al-Umari (1088/9 – 1182/3), better known by his nickname of Vatvat ("the swallow"), was a Persian secretary, poet, philologist in the Khwarazmian Empire. In addition to being a prolific author in Arabic and Persian, he also occupied high-ranking offices, serving as the chief secretary and propagandist under the Khwarazmshahs Atsiz and Il-Arslan.

Although Vatvat spent most of his life at the Khwarazmian capital of Gurganj, he was himself a native of Balkh or Bukhara. He mainly composed panegyric qasidehs, but his rhetorical work Hadā'iq al-sihr fi daqa'iq al-shi'r ("Magic Gardens of the Niceties of Poetry") is in prose.

Biography 
Vatvat was born in 1088/9 in either the city of Balkh or Bukhara, to a Sunni Persian family, which claimed descent from the second Caliph Omar. Vatvat was educated at a Nizamiya madrasa in Balkh, where he became well-read in the Arabic philological tradition. There he became a katib (scribe) by craft, and moved to the Central Asian region of Khwarazm, where he remained the rest of his life under the service of the ruling Khwarazmshahs. There Vatvat distinguished himself as a court poet, and as a result was given the post of sahib divan al-insha (chief secretary) by Khwarazmshah Atsiz, which he retained under the latters son and successor, Il-Arslan. Under the two Khwarazmshahs, Vatvat also served as a propagandist, circulating rumours that the Seljuk Empire was near its end, and the Khwarazmshahs were in ascendancy. Vatvat's loyalty towards Atsiz earned him the hostility of the latters overlord, the Seljuk ruler Ahmad Sanjar, who at one point was determined to have Vatvat cut into 30 pieces, but was talked out of it by his chief secretary Muntajab al-Din Juvayni. Vatvat died in 1182/3 in Khwarazm at the age of 97.

Personality 
According to 15th-century biographer Dawlatshah Samarqandi, he was the given the nickname "Vatvat" (the swallow) due to his small size and eloquent words. He was disliked by several poets and courtiers due to his bad temper, which led to them mock him at court meetings for his small size and baldness. Vatvat successfully defended him against these taunts with his rhetorical skills.

Works 
The divan  of Vatvat, written in Persian, contains 8,500 verses, mainly panegyric qasidas often dedicated to Atsiz. Due to his position as a poet laureate of the court, Vatvat was in extensive poetic correspondence with the leading poets of his time, such as Khaqani, Adib Sabir, and Anvari, who all praised him. Vatvat also praised them (particularly Adib Sabir) in his own poems, but his panegyrics were often written in a satirical way either due to the change of political climate or because of his notably bad temper.

References

Sources 
 
 
 
 
 
 
 

12th-century Persian-language poets
12th-century Iranian writers
Muslim panegyrists
Officials of the Khwarazmian Empire
Poets of the Khwarazmian Empire